In commerce and management, exnovation, an opposite of innovation, can occur when products and processes that have been tested and confirmed to be best-in-class are standardized to ensure that they are not innovated further. Companies that have followed exnovation as a strategy  to improve organizational performance include General Electric, Ford Motor Company and American Airlines.

One of the earliest usages of the term came in 1981, when John Kimberly referred to "removal of innovation from an organisation". In 1996 A. Sandeep provided the modern definition of exnovation as the philosophy of not innovating – in other words, ensuring that best-in-class entities are not innovated further. Since then "exnovation" has become a notable parlance in various practices, from management to medicine.

See also
 Collaborative innovation networka social construct used to describe innovative teams
 Design strategy
 Diffusion of innovationsa theory that seeks to explain how, why, and at what rate new ideas and technology spread through cultures
 Frugal innovationprocess of reducing the complexity and cost of a good and its production
 Ideas bankshared resource, usually a website, where people post, exchange, discuss, and polish new ideas
 Open innovationa paradigm that assumes that organizations can and should use external ideas as well as internal ideas
 Pro-innovation biasthe belief that an innovation should be adopted by whole society without the need of its alteration
 Technology forecastingthe prediction of future characteristics of useful technological machines, procedures or techniques
 Technology scoutinga method of technology forecasting

References

Business terms
Innovation